Lonely Won't Leave Me Alone (Jermaine Jackson song)
Lonely Won't Leave Me Alone (Trace Adkins song)